At least two warships of Japan have been named Natsugumo:

 , an  launched in 1937 and sunk in 1942
 , a  launched in 1968 and struck in 1999.

Japanese Navy ship names